Prolonged grief disorder (PGD), also known as complicated grief (CG), traumatic grief (TG) and persistent complex bereavement disorder (PCBD) in the DSM-5, is a mental disorder consisting of a distinct set of symptoms following the death of a family member or close friend (i.e. bereavement).  People with PGD are preoccupied by grief and feelings of loss to the point of clinically significant distress and impairment, which can manifest in a variety of symptoms including depression, emotional pain, emotional numbness, loneliness, identity disturbance and difficulty in managing interpersonal relationships. Difficulty accepting the loss is also common, which can present as rumination about the death, a strong desire for reunion with the departed, or disbelief that the death occurred. PGD is estimated to be experienced by about 10 percent of bereaved survivors, although rates vary substantially depending on populations sampled and definitions used.

In March 2022, PGD was added as a mental disorder in the Diagnostic and Statistical Manual of Mental Disorders, Fifth Edition, Text Revision (DSM-5-TR) with diagnostic code F43.8. PGD is also in the eleventh revision of the International Classification of Diseases (ICD-11) under code 6B42. To meet diagnosis, symptoms must occur frequently (usually at least daily) and be present for at least 6–12 months.

Symptoms

PGD behavioral symptoms include:

 Elevated rates of suicidal ideation and attempts
 Functional impairment
 High treatment-seeking behaviors
 Adverse health behaviors
PGD is also a risk factor a variety of somatic symptoms possibly including:

 Reduced quality of life in adults and in children
 Cancer
 Immunological dysfunction
 Hypertension
 Cardiac events

The individual's relationship to the deceased accounts for a large amount of variance in symptoms. Spouses, parents, and children of deceased tend to display highest severities, followed by siblings, in-laws, and friends. Subjective closeness to deceased has also been found to be an important predictor of pathologic grief responses. Bereaved persons often feel a need to understand why their loved one died by suicide, particularly if a message was not left behind by the deceased.

Grief is a common response to bereavement, occurring in a variety of severities and durations, however only a minority of cases of grief meet the severity and duration criteria to merit diagnosis of PGD; it is considered when an individual's ability to function and level of distress over the loss is extreme and persistent. People with PGD can experience a chronic aching and yearning for the dear departed, feel that they are not the same person anymore (identity disturbance), become emotionally disconnected from others, or lack the desire to "move on" (in some cases feeling that doing so would be betraying the person who is now deceased). Although normal grief remains with the bereaved person far into the future, its ability to disrupt the survivor's life is believed to dissipate with time.

Since the 1990s, studies have demonstrated the validity of distinguishing PGD from mental disorders with similar symptom clusters, specifically major depressive disorder and post-traumatic stress disorder. Validity has also been demonstrated for the DSM-5-TR criteria.

Diagnosis

DSM-5-TR 
In the DSM-5-TR, prolonged grief disorder is a classified as a "trauma and stressor-related disorder". Along with bereavement of the individual occurring at least one year ago (or six months in children and adolescents), there must be evidence of one of two "grief responses" occurring at least daily for the past month:

 Intense yearning/longing for the deceased person.
 Preoccupation with thoughts or memories of the deceased person (in children and adolescents, preoccupation may focus on the circumstances of the death).

Additionally, the individual must have at least three of the following symptoms occurring at least daily for the past month:

 Identity disruption (e.g., feeling as though part of oneself has died) since the death
 Marked sense of disbelief about the death
 Avoidance of reminders that the person is dead (in children and adolescents, may be characterized by efforts to avoid reminders)
 Intense emotional pain (e.g., anger, bitterness, sorrow) related to the death
 Difficulty reintegrating into one's relationships and activities after the death (e.g., problems engaging with friends, pursuing interests, or planning for the future)
 Emotional numbness (absence or marked reduction of emotional experience) as a result of the death
 Feeling that life is meaningless as a result of the death
 Intense loneliness as a result of the death

The duration and severity of the distress and impairment in PGD must be clinically significant, and not better explainable by social, cultural or religious norms, or another mental disorder. PGD can be distinguished from depressive disorders with distress appearing specifically about the bereaved as opposed to a general low mood. According to Holly Prigerson, an editor on the trauma and stressor-related disorder section of the DSM-5-TR, "intense, persistent yearning for the deceased person is specifically a characteristic symptom of PG [prolonged grief], but is not a symptom of MDD (or any other DSM disorder)".

ICD-11 
In the ICD-11, the symptoms required for diagnosis are:

 A history of bereavement following the death of a partner, parent, child, or other person close to the bereaved.
 A persistent and pervasive grief response characterized by longing for the deceased or persistent preoccupation with the deceased accompanied by intense emotional pain. This may be manifested by experiences such as sadness, guilt, anger, denial, blame, difficulty accepting the death, feeling one has lost a part of one's self, an inability to experience positive mood, emotional numbness, and difficulty in engaging with social or other activities.
 The pervasive grief response has persisted for an atypically long period of time following the loss, markedly exceeding expected social, cultural or religious norms for the individual's culture and context. Grief responses lasting for less than 6 months, and for longer periods in some cultural contexts, should not be regarded as meeting this requirement.
 The disturbance results in significant impairment in personal, family, social, educational, occupational or other important areas of functioning. If functioning is maintained, it is only through significant additional effort.

Compared to the DSM-5-TR diagnostic criteria, the ICD-11 requires grief responses to be present for only six months in adults as compared to one year in the DSM-5-TR.

Diagnostic criteria for PGD for inclusion in the DSM-5 and ICD-11 were proposed and revised as early as 2009. However, the DSM-5 did not include PGD, only later being included in the DSM-5-TR.

Assessment tools 
Multiple assessment tools specifically for grief related to bereavement have been developed. The first such assessment tool was the Inventory of Complicated Grief (ICG) in 1995.  the ICG remains widely used. According to a 2020 systematic review, there were eleven assessment tools at the time, three of which are designed for clinical interviews. The Traumatic Grief Inventory Self-Report was the only assessment tool found to have empirical evidence supporting use as a diagnostic tool. Later evidence suggested the ICG also remains an effective clinical assessment tool.

Causes

No specific causes guarantee onset of PGD. Known risk factors include one-time incidents along with chronic conditions and neurological abnormalities. One-time incidents include:
The death was due to a violent method, such as homicide or suicide
 The death occurred in a hospital
Miscarriage
 Lack of preparation for death, or high levels of anticipatory grief
Long-term predictors include:
 Childhood separation anxiety
 Controlling parents
 Parental abuse or death (other than that of the bereaved death)
 Close kinship relationship to the deceased (e.g., parents)
Insecure attachment styles
 Emotional dependency
Emotional closeness to the deceased before death
Two neurological abnormalities are also suspected to correlate with PGD:
 No shortened rapid eye movement (REM) latency
 Activation of the nucleus accumbens

These risk factors and clinical correlates have been largely shown to relate to PGD symptoms and not symptoms of major depressive disorder, posttraumatic stress disorder and generalized anxiety disorder.

Management

Randomized control trials have proven tricyclic antidepressants alone or together with interpersonal psychotherapy ineffective in reducing PGD symptoms, and psychotherapy designed specifically for PGD has been proven to be beneficial.

A combination of relational and cognitive-behavioral interventions have shown evidence for efficacy when treating individuals who have lost loved ones to suicide. This includes interventions that target the client's sense of self and lingering emotional attachment to the deceased, as well as any experiences of intrusion, anxiety, and/or avoidance. Acceptance of irreversibility of the death is considered a prerequisite for acceptance and acknowledgement of the loss. Exposure therapy has mixed evidence and in some cases intensifies symptoms, suggesting effectiveness does not vary significantly compared to non-exposure therapies especially with comorbid PTSD. Group therapy has mixed evidence, and has been shown to be less helpful when compared to other treatments.

Epidemiology

According to a 2017 meta-analysis, prevalence rages are estimated to be 9.8%, although later evidence in 2020 has suggested higher prevalence estimates, as high as 49% of bereaved individuals. PGD is also more prevalent when the death is by a violent method such as homicide or suicide, with an estimated 70% of those with PGD in the study having been exposed to bereavement by a violent method. Conversely, PGD is less common in cases where the bereaved death was due to natural disasters. PGD has higher prevalence in women. There is a high comorbidity rate with somatic symptom disorders, depression, anxiety and post-traumatic stress disorder, with PGS being observed as heterogenous.

There exists conflicting evidence on whether PGD is more or less common eastern countries compared to western countries.

History 

The DSM-IV and ICD-10 do not distinguish between normal and prolonged grief. Based on numerous findings of maladaptive effects of prolonged grief, diagnostic criteria for PGD have been proposed for inclusion in the DSM-5 and ICD-11. In 2018, the WHO included PGD in the ICD-11, and in March 2022 the American Psychiatric Association added PGD in the DSM-5-TR.

The proposed diagnostic criteria were the result of statistical analysis of a set of criteria agreed upon by a panel of experts. The analyses produced criteria that were the most accurate markers of bereaved individuals with painful, persistent, destructive PGD. The criteria for PGD have been validated and dozens of studies both internationally and domestically are being conducted, and published, that validate the PGD criteria in other cultures, kinship relationships to the deceased and causes of death (e.g. earthquakes, tsunami, war, genocide, fires, bombings, palliative and acute care settings).

Traumatic grief (TG) or complicated grief was a term initially used to identify a complex syndrome in which an individual experiences a unique distress resulting from the simultaneous occurrence of psychological trauma and the loss of a loved one. It was understood to be closely related to, but distinguished from, normal grief and post traumatic stress disorder. The central components originally included yearning, separation distress, and inability to acknowledge the loss.

Controversy 
Although evidence suggesting the validity of PGD has existed since 1995, its inclusion into the DSM-5-TR and ICD-11 was slow, including many rejections of earlier proposals for inclusion as a diagnosis. Part of the rationale for this rejection was a concern that "[...] introducing a grief diagnosis would pathologize normal grief reactions and potentially lead to over-prescription of psychotropic medication for the bereaved."

Recognizing prolonged grief as a disorder was argued to allow it to be better understood, detected, studied and treated. Insurance companies would also be more likely reimburse its care. However, inclusion of PGD in the DSM-5 and ICD-11 was thought at risk of being misunderstood as medicalization of grief, reducing its dignity, turning love into pathology and implying that survivors should quickly forget and "get over" the loss. Bereaved persons may be insulted by having their distress labeled as a mental disorder. While stigmatization would not be the intent, it might be an unintended consequence. In spite of this concern, studies have shown good accuracy for the ICD-11 and DSM-5-TR definitions, and that nearly all bereaved individuals who met the criteria for PGD were receptive to treatment and their families relieved to know they had a recognizable syndrome. In addition, a 2020 study found that labeling PGD symptoms with a grief-specific diagnosis does not produce additional public stigma beyond the stigma of these severe grief reactions alone.

Stigma 
Historically, there have been systemic consequences for family members that survive a loved one's suicide. During the Middle Ages families were often excommunicated and taxed by the Church if a family member had died by suicide. This often led to families losing their landholdings, inevitably being forced to live in poverty or emigrate to another region.

Some insurance policies prevent benefits from being accessed if an individual has died by suicide within a certain timeframe of taking out the policy.

References 

Grief
Types of mental disorders